Edward Cranfield (fl. 1680–1696) was an English colonial administrator.

Cranfield was governor of the Province of New Hampshire from 1682 to 1685, in an administration that was marked by hostility between Cranfield and the colonists.

Cranfield left New Hampshire in 1685 for Barbados, where he was appointed commissioner of customs, where he introduced a 4.5% tax on sugar exports, and sat on the council in the 1690s. He died 1700 and is buried in Bath Cathedral.

References

 Calendar of state papers
 English Colonies in America

Date of birth unknown
Date of death unknown
17th-century English people
Colonial governors of New Hampshire
Colony of Barbados people